Cray Wanderers Football Club is an English semi-professional football club based in Sidcup, London. Based on later reports, the club has a claim to have been established some time in 1860 in the twin villages of St Mary Cray and St Paul's Cray, near Orpington. Such a date would make it one of the oldest football clubs in the world.

They currently play their home matches at Bromley's Hayes Lane ground (capacity 5,000). The club are in the process of building their own stadium at the former Flamingo Park location on the A20 in Sidcup in South East London, which will be opening in time for the 2023–24 season.

Cray Wanderers were Kent League champions four times, and have reached the fourth qualifying round of the FA Cup twice in their history.

History

The first origins of Cray Wanderers are linked to the construction of the London, Chatham and Dover Railway line during 1858 to 1860. During their leisure time, migrant workers kicked a ball around, and that is how the club originated in the St Mary Cray village. The pitch at Star Lane is now a cemetery, and is located beneath the nine-arch railway viaduct that spans the Cray Valley. The industrial belt of the River Cray, especially the paper mills, provided much of the club's support up until the 1950s.

Cray Wanderers were a strong force in senior county football at the turn of the century. After being Kent Junior Cup semi-finalists and finalists in 1890–91 and 1891–92 they entered the first ever FA Amateur Cup competition in 1893–94. They had a spell as a professional club between 1895 and 1907. They were a nursery club for Woolwich Arsenal during part of this period. They were one of the founder members of the Kent League in 1894–95, and they won the championship in 1901–02. Other honours included Southern Suburban League champions in 1898–99, West Kent League champions in 1903–04, and Kent Senior Cup runners-up in 1899–1900.

After World War I, Cray switched to the London League where they remained until 1934. In the 1930–31 season they won the Kent Amateur Cup. Cray rejoined the Kent League in 1934–35, but their four-year stay came to grief when 1936 saw the loss of the Fordcroft ground in Cray Avenue, their home since 1898. Cray were forced to drop into a lower level of football, drifting from one temporary pitch to another while the club committee dwindled to a perilously small number. The team struggled badly in the South London Alliance and the Kent Amateur League.

1951/52 heralded a new era, and an upturn in the club's fortunes, when local businessman Mick Slater took over at the helm. The club was elected to the London League and regained its senior status. Cray moved to a new ground at Grassmeade in 1955. Their stay there was a very successful period in the club's history. Drawing extra support from the commuter town of Orpington, they played in the London League and then the Aetolian League. They were three times crowned champions, won the League Cup twice, and also won the Kent Amateur Cup three times.

Cray switched to the semi-professional Metropolitan League for five seasons commencing in 1966–67. In 1971–72 the Met London League was created by a merger of the Metropolitan League and the Greater London League.

Cray moved to Oxford Road in 1973–74. Johnny Biddle and Jimmy Wakeling proved to be successful managers. In 1974/75 Cray won the Met London League and League Cup, scoring 170 goals in all matches that season. In 1976–77 and 1977–78 Cray won the London Spartan League championship.

Cray decided to return to the Kent League in 1978–79. Success came quickly because Cray won the championship in 1980/81, having been runners-up the year before. Their powerful new team under manager Harry Richardson reached the FA Vase quarter-final and 5th round in those two seasons. After that, the 1980s decade brought only one more piece of silverware, the Kent League Cup in 1983–84. After finishing Kent League runners up in 1990/91, Cray had a lean period during most of the 1990s, with the exception of 1992–93 when they won the Kent Senior Trophy.

A new club chairman Gary Hillman arrived in 1994/95 and Ian Jenkins, a Cray player since 1993, was appointed manager in 1999. By now, Cray were tenants of Bromley F.C. As champions of the Kent League in 2002–03 and 2003–04, also reaching the FA Vase quarter-final, they achieved promotion into the Isthmian League Division One.

In the 2007–08 season Cray reached the play-off final after finishing 3rd in the table, but lost to Tooting & Mitcham United 1–0 at Imperial Fields. They also reached the Kent Senior Cup final, played at Hayes Lane on 26 July, where they lost to Ebbsfleet United 4–0. Cray again reached the play-off final the following year, in which they beat Metropolitan Police 1–0 and were promoted to the Isthmian League Premier Division.

Cray Wanderers celebrated their 150th anniversary during the summer of 2010, including friendlies against the other two oldest clubs in the world, Sheffield and Hallam, in a three-team tournament.

Ian Jenkins, who had managed the club for 14 years, left in September 2013. Keith Bird and Mike Paye, managers of Bromley's reserve team, were appointed as manager and assistant manager respectively. The team was relegated into the Isthmian League Division One North at the end of April 2014. Gary Abbott and Mike Paye became joint managers of the team at the start of October 2014. On 5 January 2015 the club appointed Tommy Warrilow as the new manager. Warrilow masterminded a dramatic "Great Escape" from a second successive relegation as the team won their last ten games of the season.

Former player Tony Russell took over for the 2015–16 season, guiding the team to fourth place in Division One North. Cray therefore qualified for the promotion play-offs but lost to Harlow Town. Two years later, they reached the play-offs again, this time after finishing 3rd in Division One South, but lost 5–2 to Walton Casuals. On 13 April 2019, Cray secured their return to the Premier Division with a 3–1 win over Ashford United to win the inaugural Division One South-East title. The following season, Cray were challenging for a second successive promotion when the season was abandoned due to the COVID-19 pandemic.

League history
Information taken from club stats book.

Grounds
Cray Wanderers currently play their home games at Hayes Lane, Bromley.

Cray started playing football at Star Lane, now a cemetery. After playing at numerous other grounds, Cray played at Grassmeade from 1954 to 1973, after which they moved to Oxford Road.  Unfortunately for the club, in 1998 the Kent League ruled that clubs must have floodlighting.  As Cray were unable to have lights installed, they were forced to move out and share the Hayes Lane ground of Bromley, although their reserve and youth teams continued to play at the former ground until 2011, when it was taken over by Seven Acre Sports & Sidcup.

In the summer of 2008, Cray announced plans to move to a new stadium near Orpington by 2014. Official plans published on the club's official website on 18 February 2009 confirmed that the new ground at Sandy Lane would be open by 2014, for the 2014–15 season, subject to planning consent. The stadium, which is proposed to be part of a new "Sports Village-like complex" is set to be eco-friendly and be built to an initial Conference standard.

The bid was rejected unanimously, by all councillors on Bromley Council's Development Control Committee on Thursday 20 September 2012. This was for a number of reasons, but mainly because the club was hoping to build a Football League sized stadium, using the profits from building nearly 200 houses and a large hotel on Green Belt land.

In the debate on the application, which was opposed by the Police and the GLA as well as other bodies, it was clear that Councillors were supportative of a proposal to relocate Cray Wanderers to a new home in St Pauls Cray, but not to the building of houses, a hotel and another swimming pool, given that LA Leisure already have a swimming pool opposite the site, in order to fund it.

On 3 October 2014, Cray Wanderers signed a conditional contract to purchase Flamingo Park Sports Centre in St Paul's Cray on the A20 Sidcup bypass. The club had an 18-month period to obtain planning consent from Bromley Council for a new sporting community hub, featuring a new multi-sport stadium with a spectator capacity of 1,300. This was achieved in April 2016, when the council approved the proposal. There was disappointment when the application was later refused by the Mayor of London and a revised set of plans were being prepared in 2017. These were finally approved in November 2018, with hopes that the club will be able to move in for the start of the 2023–24 season

Academy
The Cray Wanderers Academy, based at Coopers School, Chislehurst, was established in January 2009 by representatives of the club (Gary Hillman and Darren Anslow) and school (Oliver Hobbs and Shirley Puxty).  The academy competed in the Isthmian Youth League from the 2009–10 season, finishing second.  In its first season it already showed signs of success, with youngster George Porter breaking into the senior first team in the academy's first season, impressing to the extent that he was signed by professional club Leyton Orient at the end of the season. Several other players have made first team appearances during the first season.

It was decided at the beginning of 2016 that this arrangement with Coopers School would come to an end.  As from the 2022–23 season Cray Wanderers will be again running a football youth academy out of their new stadium in Sidcup, Kent.

Honours
Isthmian League Division One
Winners (South East): 2018–19
Runners-up (South): 2008–09
Play-off Winners (South): 2008–09
Kent League: 1901–02, 1980–81, 2002–03, 2003–04
Runners Up: 1979–80, 1990–91
London League: 1956–57, 1957–58
Runners Up: 1953–54, 1954–55
Aetolian League: 1962–63
Greater London League: 1965-66
Metropolitan-London League: 1974-75
London Spartan League: 1976–77, 1977–78
Kent Senior Trophy: 1992–92, 2003–04
Kent Amateur Cup: 1930–31, 1962–63, 1963–64, 1964–65
Best league performance: 9th in Isthmian League Premier Division, 2010–11, 2011–12, (Cray were 2nd in the Isthmian League Premier Division when the 2019–20 season was abandoned in March 2020)
Best FA Cup performance: 4th qualifying round, 2005–06, 2020–21
Best FA Amateur Cup performance: 3rd round (last 16), 1967–68
Best FA Trophy performance: 3rd round, 2021–22
Best FA Vase performance: Quarter-finals, 1979–80, 2003–04
Best Kent Senior Cup performance: Final, 1900–01, 2007–08

Current squad

Club staff

Records
Record attendance: 2160 vs Leytonstone (FA Amateur Cup, 1969)
Biggest Win: 15–0 vs Sevenoaks, 1894–95
Biggest Defeat: 1–11 vs Bromley, 1920–21
Biggest Isthmian League Win: 9–1 vs, Ashford United 2017–18 
Biggest Isthmian League Defeat: 3–9 vs Kingstonian, 2012–13

Player records
Most appearances: John Dorey, 454 (1961–72), Jamie Wood, 461 (including some as non-playing sub) (1996-2010)
Most goals: Ken Collishaw, 274 (1954–65)

Managerial history
Information taken from club stats book.

(includes league games only)

References

External links

Official website

Association football clubs established in 1860
Football clubs in England
Isthmian League
Sport in the London Borough of Bromley
1860 establishments in England
Metropolitan League
Metropolitan–London League
Greater London League
Aetolian League (football)
Football clubs in London
Southern Counties East Football League
London League (football)